The 2010 FINA Swimming World Cup was a series of seven short-course meters (25m) meets, held from September-early November 2010. The 2010 series was again titled sponsored by Arena.

Meets
The 2010 World Cup featured 7 meets (one more than 2009), which were divided into 3 segments: the first meet (Brazil, in September), an Asian leg (October), and a European leg (late October–November). Meet dates and locations are:

Results

Overall World Cup
At each meet of the World Cup circuit in 2010, the FINA Points Table was used to rank all swim performances at the meet. The top 10 men and top 10 women were then be awarded World Cup points. Bonus points were awarded for a world record broken (20 points) or equalled (10 points). The number of World Cup points awarded was doubled for the final meet of the World Cup in Stockholm.

Men
Official Overall Scoring:

Women
Official Overall Scoring:

Event winners

50 m freestyle

100 m freestyle

200 m freestyle

400 m freestyle

1500 m (men) / 800 m (women) freestyle

50 m backstroke

100 m backstroke

200 m backstroke

50 m breaststroke

100 m breaststroke

200 m breaststroke

50 m butterfly

100 m butterfly

200 m butterfly

100 m individual medley

200 m individual medley

400 m individual medley

Legend:

Victories by country

See also
List of World Cup records in swimming

References

FINA Swimming World Cup
Fina Swimming World Cup, 2010